Bangkok Yai is one of the 50 districts (khet) of Bangkok, Thailand. Neighbouring districts are (from north clockwise) Bangkok Noi, Phra Nakhon (across Chao Phraya River), Thon Buri, Phasi Charoen, and Taling Chan.

History
The district is named after Khlong Bangkok Yai (คลองบางกอกใหญ่, also called Khlong Bang Luang, คลองบางหลวง) which was actually part of Chao Phraya River until a canal dug in 1522 during the Ayutthaya period altered the flow of the river such that the canal became the main river and the section of original river became present-day Khlong Bangkok Yai. Bangkok Yai, or more precisely, the Wat Arun Sub-district, was also the site of Thon Buri when the capital was set up here from 1767-1782.

Originally called Amphoe Hongsaram (อำเภอหงสาราม) when the district was set up in 1915, it was renamed "Amphoe Bangkok Yai" in 1916, demoted to a king amphoe of amphoe Bang Yi Khan (อำเภอบางยี่ขัน) in 1938, promoted back to amphoe in 1958, and finally changed to a khet in an administrative reform in 1972.

Administration
The district is sub-divided into two sub-districts (khwaeng).

Places

Temples

 Wat Arun
 Wat Hong Rattanaram
 Wat Khruea Wan
 Wat Molilokkayaram
 Wat Ratchasittharam
Wat Nak Klang
Wat Tha Phra
Wat Chao Mun
Wat Diduat
Wat Pradu Chimphli
Wat Pradu Nai Songtham
Wat Sangkrachai
Wat Mai Phiren

Historic sites

 Wang Derm Palace
Wichai Prasit Fort

Education

Taweethapisek School
Ratchadamnoen Commercial School
Wiboon Business Administration College
Siam Technological College
Sesawech Vidhaya School
Ritthinarongron School
Wat Pradu Nai Songtham School
Bangkok Commercial School
Saiprasit Business Administration Technological
Saiprasit School
Prasart Wittaya Anuchon School

Government offices
Royal Thai Navy Convention Center
The Kingdom of Lesotho Consulate
Bangkokyai Police Station
Tha Phra Police Station

Transportation
Tha Phra Intersection
Tha Phra MRT Station
Chao Phraya River
Khlong Bangkok Yai
Khlong Mon
Phanitchayakan Thon Buri Junction
Itsaraphap MRT Station

Main roads
Phet Kasem Road
Charan Sanit Wong Road
Itsaraphap Road
Ratchadaphisek Road
Arun Amarin Road
Wang Doem Road

References

External links
 Bangkok Yai district office (Thai only)

 
Districts of Bangkok
1915 establishments in Siam